The Hindu Council of Russia represents members of the Hindu religion in Russia. The council was created on December 19, 2011, in light of the Bhagavad Gita trial in Russia, by "Hindus from India, Bangladesh, Mauritius, Nepal and other countries residing in Russia." Sadhu Priya Das is the current chairman.

See also 
 Hinduism in Russia

References

External links 
 

Hindu organizations based in Russia
2011 establishments in Russia
Religious organizations established in 2011